Botafogo Esporte Clube, commonly known as Botafogo, was a Brazilian football team based in Teresina, Piauí state. They won the Campeonato Piauiense five times.

History
The club was founded in 1930. They won the Campeonato Piauiense in 1941, 1945, 1946, 1949, and in 1957, and the Campeonato Piauiense Second Level in 1965.

Achievements

 Campeonato Piauiense:
 Winners (5): 1941, 1945, 1946, 1949, 1957
 Campeonato Piauiense Second Level:
 Winners (1): 1965

Stadium
Botafogo Esporte Clube played their home games at Estádio Lindolfo Monteiro, nicknamed Lindolfinho. The stadium has a maximum capacity of 8,000 people.

References

Association football clubs established in 1930
Defunct football clubs in Piauí
1930 establishments in Brazil